Dmitriy Borisovich Volkov (born 9 July 1976 in Moscow) is an entrepreneur and philosopher He co-founded Social Discovery Group (SDGroup), an international internet holding with headquarters in Malta, and сo-owns Dating Group.

In 2016 he founded SDG Arts and Science Foundation.

He holds a Ph.D in philosophy and co-founded Moscow Center for Consciousness Studies at the Philosophy Department of Moscow State University.

Business 
In 1998 Volkov founded IT-online, the company specializing in development and promotion of online projects.

In 2014, SDGroup, an internet holding, was founded along with foreign partners, it consolidated Volkov's assets after the sale of IT-Online. The headquarters of SDGroup is located in Malta.

Since 2013 and through SDGroup Volkov invested about $20 million in Bitfury, a blockchain software and hardware developer.

In April 2018, Dmitriy Volkov and Yuriy Gurskiy joined the Managing Board of Gagarin Capital venture fund owned by Nikolay Davidov and Mikhail Taver. In 2019, Dmitriy sold a part of his intellectual property to the management company for $215 million and acquired a share in Dating Group, a joint venture. Dating Group is one of the biggest companies in the industry, with 73 million registered users and annual revenue of $200 million. The Dating Group includes Dating.com, Cupid Media, AnastasiaDate, AsianDate, ArabianDate, AfricaBeauties, AmoLatina, EuroDate, YourChristianDate, DateMyAge and ChinaLove. In 2021, Dating Group acquired Once, the Swiss dating app.

The dating.com group appears in the ICIJ offshore leaks database.

The holding company also owns a real estate fund, Real Estate Discovery Ventures (REDV). As of 2019, the estimated fund value is $198 million. The fund mainly focuses on the US shopping malls.

Since 2001, Dmitriy Volkov has been a member of the Project Management Institute community, and since 2006, a member of Usability Professional Association. He has an Executive MBA degree from Moscow School of Management Skolkovo and a number of certificates from Harvard Business School. He is a partner of a number of international funds, for example Blockchain Capital and Mangrove Capital Partners.

Art Activity

In the spring of 2015, Volkov assisted in publishing a series of art books "Contemporary Art" dedicated to the modern Russian artists, and their role in the context of the development of Russian and global culture. He performed and held a number of art events together with Oleg Kulik, a modern artist and a performer, including “Strict Proof of an External World” in the spring of 2015. In the summer of 2015 he organized an expedition of Social Discovery Group employees to the Burning Man, where he presented the result of his latest project with Oleg Kulik – installation "Oraculetang".

In September 2015 Volkov arranged a pop-up exhibition of modern technological art "Superconduction: challenge of art & technology"  in Riga.

From January 1, 2016 to 2017 he was a member of the Board of Trustees of the Tretyakov Gallery support Fund. On 15 April 2016, a new exhibition "Modern art: 1960-2000. Restart” was launched in Tretyakov Gallery with his contribution.

In 2016-2017, the fund partnered the grant program of Garage Museum of Contemporary Art that awards grants to young artists of "Art and technology", and Dmitriy became the museum patron till 2021.

In September 2016, during the exhibition "Collection! Modern art in the USSR and Russia in 1950-2000" he presented the Parisian Centre Pompidou with a piece by Sergey Bugaev-Afrika.

In 2017, Business Insider named "Aliens? — Yes!", the collaboration of Dmitriy Volkov and the artist Andrey Bartenev, one of the best scenes of the Burning Man festival in Nevada, USA.

In May 2019, Dmitriy Volkov, together with media artists Natalia Altufova and Yaroslav Kravtsov, presented a multimedia pop-up project Faced2Faced, as part of the special program at the 58th Venice Biennale.

In 2018, Volkov's fund SDG Arts & Science Foundation partnered with the Educational Center of the Moscow Museum of Modern Art. On November 28, 2019 the Moscow Museum of Modern Art launched the exhibition "This Is Not a Book. Collection of Dmitriy Volkov. The story of a man, his art and library." This exhibition became a part of the museum’s educational program.

Academic activity

Academic career
In 1998, he graduated from the History Department of Moscow State University (MSU) and later took the postgraduate programme in International relations in IMEMO. In 2003, he enrolled at the Philosophy Department of MSU, and later took a graduate program in philosophy. In 2008, he defended Ph.D thesis with "D. Dennett's theory of consciousness"as the subject. In 2009, he became one of the founders of Moscow Center for Consciousness Studies at the Philosophy Department of Moscow State University. The Center supports and facilitates studies in  the fields of philosophy of mind, personal identity, free will and moral responsibility. In 2012, he published the book "Boston zombie: D.Dennett and his theory of consciousness." In 2014, he became a member of the American Philosophical Association.  The international scientific conference "Problems of consciousness and free will in analytical philosophy" was held during the expedition. In 2017, Dmitriy Volkov defended his Dr. habil. thesis on "Problems of free will and moral responsibility in analytic philosophy in late XX – early XXI century". In February 2019, Volkov published his second book "Free will: Illusion or opportunity".

Researches and Main Ideas

In his book "Boston zombie: D.Dennett and his theory of consciousness" Dmitriy Volkov criticized arguments of Dennett, Searle and Vasiliev on intentionality and mental causation. He analyzed the Multiple Drafts Model proposed by Dennett and his critique of the  "Cartesian theater" as well as the project of disqualifying qualia. Volkov provided counterarguments against Dennett's thought experiments. Apart from that, the book also addresses the concept of the Self as the center of narrative gravity. According to Sergey Merzlyakov, scholar of the Scientific Research Lab of the MSU Economics Department, Volkov's book is the most complete and accurate research of Dennett's theory of consciousness.

Major works 

Free will in R. Kane's libertarianism D. B. Volkov. Moscow University Bulletin. Series 7: Philosophy. 2015. no. 6.  P. 32-51.
About organizing the Greenland conference "Problems of consciousness and free will in analytical philosophy" D. B. Volkov, D. Dennett. Moscow University Bulletin. Series 7: Philosophy. 2015. no. 6.  P. 3-7.
Does causal trajectory argument of V. V. Vasiliev disprove local supervenience of mental nature over physical nature? D. B. Volkov. Epistemology and Philosophy of Science. 2015. V. 2. P. 166—182. 2
What do manipulations with D. Pereboom's "Manipulation argument" prove? D. B. Volkov. Philosophy and Culture. 2015. No. 6. P. 933—942. 0
Boston zombie. D.Dennett and his theory of consciousness. D. B. Volkov. Moscow, 2011. Ser. Philosophy of consciousness
"D. Dennett's theory of consciousness". D. B. Volkov. Thesis for a Candidate Degree in Philosophical Sciences / Moscow State University. Moscow 2008
Disputes on consciousness and analytical philosophy. D. B. Volkov. Epistemology and Philosophy of science. 2007. V. 13. No. 3. P. 176—181.
Inconsistency of manipulation arguments and disappearing agent for the problem of free will and moral responsibility. D. B. Volkov. Problems of Philosophy 2017. No. 6. P. 29-38.
What do Russian philosophers think about? Internet survey results. D. B. Volkov. Moscow University Bulletin. Series 7: Philosophy. 2017. no. 6.  P. 84-116.
Solution of the mental causality in biological naturalism of J. Searle. D. B. Volkov. Philosophical thought. 2017. No. 2. P. 1-12.
Free will: new turns of old discussion D. B. Volkov. Philosophy Journal. 2017. V. 10. No. 1. P. 58-77.
"Thesis on Consciousness" and moral responsibility in researches of Neil Levy. D. B. Volkov. Logos. 2016. V. 26. No. 5. P. 213—226.
Exclusion argument of J. Kim and problem of mental causality. D. B. Volkov. Moscow University Bulletin. Series 7: Philosophy. 2016. no. 6.  P. 15-32.
Narrative approach as the solution to the problem of personal identity. D. B. Volkov. St. Petersburg State University Bulletin. 2016. V. 17. No. 4. P. 21-32.
Problem of mental causality: Overview of the latest researches. D. B. Volkov. Philosophy and Culture. 2016. No. 6. P. 673 −682.
Problem of free will. Overview of the key researches of the late XX – early XXI century in analytical philosophy.  D. B. Volkov. Philosophy Journal. M.: The RAS Institute of Philosophy. 2016. V. 9. No. 3. P. 175—189.
Review of a 2014 D. Pereboom's book "Free will". D. B. Volkov. Tomsk University Bulletin. Philosophy. Sociology. Politology. 2016. No. 4. P. 404 −409.
Are psychopaths morally responsible persons? D. B. Volkov. Tomsk University Bulletin. Philosophy. Sociology. Politology. 2016. No. 2(34). P. 212 −222.
Chinese room. Date compote. 2015. No. 8.
Where am I? Incredible figures of D. Dennett. D. B. Volkov. Philosophy of consciousness. Analytical tradition. 3rd Gryaznov's readings. Materials of the *International Scientific Conference. 2009.
Strong version of artificial intelligence. D. B. Volkov. Philosophy of consciousness: classics and modernity: 2nd Gryaznov's readings. 2007.
Free will: Illusion or opportunity. Dmitriy Volkov. Moscow 2018.
The Conscious Mind: In search of a Fundamental Theory. Translation from English / published with participation of Moscow consciousness research center. Moscow, 2013. Ser. Philosophy of consciousness (editor)

References

External links
 Official blog on the site Сноб
 List of publications on the website of the scientific electronic library eLibrary
 Dmitry Volkov's profile on the portal Academia.edu

Businesspeople from Moscow
Russian philosophers
1976 births
Living people